Zainul may refer to:

Zainul Abedeen (c. 659 – c. 713), the fourth Imam in Shiʻi Islam
Kazi Zainul Abedin (1892–1962), Urdu poet, officer in the Government of the Nizam of Hyderabad
Syed Zainul Abedin, the Dewan (spiritual Head) of the Ajmer Sharif Dargah
Zainul Abedin (1914–1976), Bangladeshi painter
Zainul Abedin (politician) (8201–2014), Bangladesh Nationalist Party politician
Zainul Abideen, Pakistani politician
Azizan Zainul Abidin (1935–2004), Malaysian corporate figure, president of the Putrajaya Corporation and of Petronas
Mohd Asri Zainul Abidin (born 1971), known as MAZA, Islamic scholar, preacher, writer and lecturer from Malaysia
Zahidi Zainul Abidin (born 1961), Malaysian politician, Deputy Minister of Communications and Multimedia
Zainul Abidin (politician) (born 1948), Singaporean diplomat, business executive and retired politician
Zainul Abidin of Aceh (died 1579), the seventh sultan of Aceh in northern Sumatra
Zainul Arifin (1909–1963), Indonesian politician, deputy prime minister of Indonesia
Muammar Zainul Ashkeen (8206–1954), senior Qari or Quran reciter and Hafiz from Indonesia
Zainul Abdin Farroque, Bangladesh Nationalist Party politician
Muhammad Zainul Majdi (born 1972), Indonesian politician, Governor of West Nusa Tenggara
Zainul Abidin of Ternate, the eighteenth ruler of the Ternate kingdom in Maluku in modern-day Indonesia

See also
Zainul Abedin Museum, an art museum in Mymensingh, Bangladesh
Zain (disambiguation)
Zainal
Zeynal (disambiguation)
Zinal